Aimé Proot (born 1890, date of death unknown) was a Belgian long-distance runner. He competed in the men's 10,000 metres at the 1920 Summer Olympics.

References

1890 births
1959 deaths
Athletes (track and field) at the 1920 Summer Olympics
Belgian male long-distance runners
Olympic athletes of Belgium
Place of birth missing
Olympic cross country runners